The women's duet competition of the synchronized swimming events at the 2015 Pan American Games in Toronto was held from July 9 to July 11, at the Toronto Pan Am Sports Centre. The defending Pan American Champion was duet from Canada.

All twelve duets competed in both rounds of the competition. The first round consisted of a technical, while the second round was a free routine.  The winner was the duet with the highest combined score. The technical routine consisted of ten required elements, which had to be completed in order and within a time of between 2 minutes 5 seconds and 2 minutes 35 seconds. The free routine had no restrictions other than time; this routine had to last between 3 minutes 15 seconds and 3 minutes 45 seconds.

The winner Canada qualified to compete in the 2016 Summer Olympics in Rio de Janeiro, Brazil.

Schedule
All times are local Eastern Daylight Time (UTC−4)

Results

References

Synchronized swimming at the 2015 Pan American Games